Antonio Mendoza may refer to:

Antonio Mendoza (sport shooter) (born 1939), Filipino sport shooter
Antonio (Tony) Mendoza (born 1941), Cuban-American photographer
Antonio de Mendoza y Pacheco (1495-1552), first viceroy of New Spain
Antonio Mendoza (artist) (born 1960), artist
Dr. Antonio Mendoza, (XVIII century), physician

See also
Antonio Hurtado de Mendoza (1586-1644), Spanish dramatist